Willis Joshua Bailey (October 12, 1854 – May 19, 1932) was an American  politician and Republican United States Representative from Kansas and the 16th Governor of Kansas.

Born in Carroll County, Illinois, Bailey attended the common schools, Mount Carroll High School, and the University of Illinois. He married Ida B. Weede on June 9, 1903, and had two stepchildren.

Bailey moved to Nemaha County, Kansas, in 1879, and became a successful farmer, rancher, and banker. He and his father founded the town of Baileyville, Kansas in 1880. He served as member of the Kansas House of Representatives from 1888 to 1890. He was president of the Republican State League in 1893. He served as member of the Kansas State Board of Agriculture from 1895 to 1899.

Bailey was elected as a Republican to the Fifty-sixth Congress (March 4, 1899 – March 3, 1901). He was not a candidate for renomination in 1900 to the Fifty-seventh Congress.

In 1902 Bailey won the Republican gubernatorial nomination and the general election and served as Governor of Kansas from 1903 to 1905. During his tenure, construction on the state capitol was completed, railroad commissioners and the office of state printer became elective positions, and a law banning gambling devices was sanctioned.

Bailey moved to Atchison, Kansas, in 1907 and engaged in the banking business. He was elected a director of the Federal Reserve Bank of Kansas City, Missouri, in 1914, and then governor of the bank in 1922, and served until his death.

Bailey died in Mission Hills, Kansas, May 19, 1932. He is interred at Mount Vernon Cemetery, Atchison, Kansas.

References

External links

 
National Governors Association
Kansas State Library
The Political Graveyard
Publications concerning Kansas Governor Bailey's administration available via the KGI Online Library

|-

|-

|-

1854 births
1932 deaths
American bankers
Federal Reserve Bank of Kansas City presidents
Republican Party governors of Kansas
Republican Party members of the Kansas House of Representatives
People from Atchison, Kansas
People from Carroll County, Illinois
People from Nemaha County, Kansas
Republican Party members of the United States House of Representatives from Kansas
University of Illinois Urbana-Champaign alumni